Nikad nije kasno (Serbian Cyrillic: Никад није касно, translation: It's never too late) is a Serbian talent show which has debuted in 2015 and which is been broadcast on Pink TV. The show's title is an ode to Đorđe Marjanović's hit of the 1970s. The song is featured in the intro and outro of the program.

Format
There are competitors who are older than 40 years of age (previously 45), who represent the greatest hits of pop and folk music. The show prides itself on giving a chance to those who did not manage to realise their singing ambitions earlier in life, and on being lighthearted. Candidates are assessed by a three member judging panel, where two judges are special guests and one judge is permanent. In earlier seasons, there were two permanent jury members who were; famous composer and songwriter, Saša Milošević Mare and, legendary singer of Serbian folk music, Vesna Zmijanac. However, Zmijanac left the show. Milošević has remained as a permanent jury member, and is referred to as the president of the judging panel. Also, in one of the earlier seasons, there were episodes where the judging panel had 4 members, 3 special guest judges and Milošević. The two guest judges are usually popular regional singers, though they may be actors, athletes, etc. In addition, they may make more than one appearance throughout the season. One of the producers of Grand Production and the creator of the talent show Zvezde Granda; is also the creator of this show, Saša Žika Jakšić. Jakšić's role in the show is to interview the contestant and those who come to support them, family or friends, in order to make them feel comfortable. He has occasionally acted as one of the guest judges. The show has been hosted by Dragana Katić since its inception.There is also an in-house orchestra led by Aleksandar Sofronijević Sofro.

The show is open to people from all countries. Most contestants are from the countries of the former Yugoslavia, with some even coming from the diaspora.

In the first round, contestants are introduced through their audition video where they give insight into their lives e.g., why they love music, what stopped them from having a musical career, etc. It then transitions to them being in the studio and Žika further interviewing them. They then sing one song of their choice.

In the second round, there is a recap of the contestants' first appearance. Žika then asks them what reactions they received and how they are feeling. They then sing a song, but that is not the only time they will sing in the episode. However, it is the only performance that will be assessed. Following their solo performance, the contestant is joined by a family member or friend to sing a song. If their relative or friend does not sing, one of the two guest judges, who are usually singers, will join the contestant on stage. The second performance is purely for entertainment purposes.

In the third round, there is also a recap, but now of both the first and second rounds. The contestant then sings a song, which will be used to assess them. In this round, as opposed to the first two, the judges will give more in-depth critiques. Also, in this round, there are 3 guest singers, who along with the judges, will take turns in sharing a duet with each contestant. This performance will not be assessed and is purely for entertainment.

At the beginning of the episode, and/or during the transitions between contestants, each guest judge/singer sings one song or a couple of songs; theirs' or of their colleagues. However, they do not have to sing. For example, if they are an actor, it will cut to a trailer of their most recent project.

After each contestant has performed, the judging panel must choose two, out of usually five, but sometimes six, contestants to send to the next round. Out of the remaining three/four, the studio audience will choose one contestant to send to the next round. In the 48 hours following the episode, the internet audience is able to vote for one of the remaining two/three contestants to go on to the next round through the show's website.

In the fourth round, the duelling begins. Essentially, two contestants verse one another. In this round, previous performances are taken into consideration as well; a quick recap is shown to establish the contestant's journey throughout the contest before they perform. Unlike previous rounds, during the recap, the contestant is sitting next to Žika in the guest area rather than on the stage. They are allowed one support person in this round. During the voting stage, each of the three judges votes for one of the contestants, followed by a joint vote of the public (the contestant who polls the highest gets the vote), and then a joint vote from Aleksandar Sofronijević's Orchestra. The contestant who gets the most points advances to the next round. The contestant who gets the least ends up in the barrage. As there are 4 duelling pairs, 4 contestants advance directly to the next round, and 4 contestants end up in the barrage. The in-studio audience then takes part in another poll and the contestant with the highest percentage goes on to the next round. An internet poll is held for the next 48 hours in order to decide who of the three remaining contestants will get a place in the next round.

In the fifth round, which works as the quarter-finals, eight contestants participate. Just like the other rounds, there is a recap before they perform and a chat with the judges and hosts. In this round, the contestant performs one song. Once all of the contestants have performed, the judges select four contestants, giving them a place in the semi-final. Out of the remaining four, the audience in the studio chooses one contestant to send to the next round. Of the remaining three contestants, the tv audience chooses one contestant to send to the semi-final through an online poll. It is in this round that it is announced that prospective contestants can begin applying for the next season.

Aleksandar Sofronijević's orchestra will no longer be the in-house orchestra from the eighth season onwards.

References 
Nikad nije kasno

Serbian talent shows
Serbian-language television shows